SG Wannabe by SG Wannabe 7 Part.I is the first part of the seventh Korean studio album by SG Wannabe. The second part was due to be released in November the same year but was not released until March 2011.

"Winter Tree" was the first single released from the album.

The music video for "Sunflower" featured Baek Sung Hyun.

Track listing

References

SG Wannabe albums
Stone Music Entertainment albums
2010 albums